Marcin Kasprzak (2 November, 1860 – 8 December, 1905) was a Polish Marxist revolutionary and a prominent leader of Poland's labour movement. He was a member of the Social Democratic Party of Germany, the First Proletariat party, the Polish Socialist Party in Prussia, and the Social Democracy of the Kingdom of Poland and Lithuania party, and was a founder of the Second Proletariat party.

Kasprzak was born the son of a laborer on November 2, 1860, in the village of Czołowo in Sremski County. In 1885 he moved to Berlin and joined the German Social Democratic Party. He soon returned to his homeland, where he joined the International Social Revolutionary Party "Proletariat" (usually referred to by the names First Proletariat or Great Proletariat party).

Kasprzak was arrested in 1885, but escaped prison in 1887 and fled to Switzerland, then illegally arrived in Warsaw the same year. After the destruction of the First Proletariat in 1888, Kasprzak became one of the founders and leaders of the Social Revolutionary Party "Proletariat" (usually referred to by the names Second Proletariat or Small Proletariat party). According to some sources, in 1889 Kasprzak also helped to smuggle out Rosa Luxemburg out of Poland; she moved to Switzerland.

In 1891, Kasprzak fled to exile in London. In 1893, he was arrested while trying to cross the border of the Russian Empire. Released from prison in 1896, he joined the Polish Socialist Party in Prussia.

In 1904, Kasprzak returned to the Russian-controlled Congress Poland and joined the Social Democracy of the Kingdom of Poland and Lithuania (SDKPiL) party. On April 27, 1904, during a police raid on an underground printing press in Warsaw, Kasprzak participated in armed resistance, during which four policemen were killed and several others wounded.

Kasprzak was executed on September 8, 1905, in the Warsaw Citadel.

References

1860 births
1905 deaths
Polish revolutionaries
Executed revolutionaries
Polish people executed by the Russian Empire
People from Poznań County
Executed people from Greater Poland Voivodeship